Muhammad Fauzan Jamal (born 6 June 1988 in Padang) is an Indonesian professional footballer who plays as a centre-back for Liga 2 club Persiba Balikpapan.

Club career

Persebaya (Bhayangkara)
On December 25, 2014, he signed one-year contract with  Persebaya Bhayangkara and was announced as a Persebaya player.

Persela Lamongan
On September 13, 2016, he signed one-year contract with Persela Lamongan where he played in this club as a left back to replace Zulvin Zamrun who resigned.

Persepam Madura Utama
On February 10, 2017, he signed a contract with Liga 2 club Persepam Madura Utama.

Persijap Jepara
In August 2017, he rejoined his old club, Persijap Jepara in second round of competition. he was quite enthusiastic about returning to Persijap. The offer of direct management was greeted by him.

PSM Makassar
On March 13, 2018, Fauzan signed a one-year contract with Liga 1 club PSM Makassar. He took the number 25 shirt for the 2018 Liga 1 season. Fauzan made his debut on 25 March 2018 in a match against PSM Makassar.

PSIS Semarang
He was signed for PSIS Semarang to play in Liga 1 in the 2019 season.

Kalteng Putra
In 2020, Fauzan Jamal signed a one-year contract with Indonesian Liga 2 club Kalteng Putra.

International career
In 2009, Jamal represented the Indonesia U-23, in the 2009 Southeast Asian Games.

References

External links 
 Fauzan Jamal at ligaindonesiabaru.com

1988 births
Association football midfielders
Living people
Minangkabau people
Indonesian footballers
West Sumatra sportspeople
Liga 1 (Indonesia) players
Persidafon Dafonsoro players
Indonesian Premier Division players
Semen Padang F.C. players
People from Padang
Sportspeople from West Sumatra